Nadine Provençal is an assistant professor at Simon Fraser University and Investigator at BC Children's Hospital Research Institute. In 2020, she was recognized by the Canadian Institute for Advanced Research (CIFAR) with an appointment to CIFAR Azrieli Global Scholar.

Early life and education
Provençal earned her Bachelor of Science degree in biology from Montreal's Université Laval before enrolling at McGill University for her PhD in Pharmacology and Therapeutics. Upon receiving her PhD, Provençal completed her postdoctoral training at the Université de Montréal and accepted a research fellowship from the Canadian Institutes of Health Research to complete a second postdoctoral training at the Max-Planck Institute of Psychiatry (MPIP) in Germany. While completing her second postdoctoral training, she received a $50,000 grant from the Canadian Institute for Health Research Fellowship to focus on neuronal cellular models with multiple tissues from non-human primates also exposed to glucocorticoid activation.

Career
In 2018, Provençal was recruited for a joint appointment at Simon Fraser University faculty of Health Sciences and BC Children’s Hospital Research Institute. Alongside Faranak Farzan and William Odom, she received $450,000 through the Canada Foundation for Innovation John R. Evans Leaders Fund to study exposure to early life stress. Provençal later led a study titled Glucocorticoid exposure during hippocampal neurogenesis primes future stress response by inducing changes in DNA methylation which found that when fetuses are exposures to stress during pregnancy by the mother, it affects them later in life. She also received $300,000 to open a new laboratory at SFU called Epigenomics of Developmental Trajectories, which would include sequencing platform capable of analyzing the entire genome of multiple individuals.

In 2020, Provençal was recognized by the Canadian Institute for Advanced Research (CIFAR) with an appointment to CIFAR Azrieli Global Scholar.

References

External links
 

Living people
Academic staff of Simon Fraser University
McGill University Faculty of Science alumni
Université Laval alumni
Year of birth missing (living people)

Glucocorticoids